Bernard Becaas (1955–2000) was a French cyclist.

References

1955 births
2000 deaths
French male cyclists
French Giro d'Italia stage winners
Road incident deaths in France
People from Oloron-Sainte-Marie
Motorcycle road incident deaths
Sportspeople from Pyrénées-Atlantiques
Cyclists from Nouvelle-Aquitaine
20th-century French people